Ambonnay is a commune in the Marne department in northeastern France.

Population

Champagne
The village's vineyards are located in the Montagne de Reims subregion of Champagne, and are classified as Grand Cru (100%) in the Champagne vineyard classification. A Clos-type vineyard in the village is the source of Krug's Clos d'Ambonnay.

See also
Communes of the Marne department
Classification of Champagne vineyards
Montagne de Reims Regional Natural Park

References

Communes of Marne (department)
Grand Cru Champagne villages